Clave or claves may refer to:

Music
 Clave (rhythm), a rhythmic pattern found in some Afro-Cuban Music
 Claves, a percussion instrument
 Claves Records, Swiss record label

Other
 Clave (newspaper), a Dominican newspaper
 Clave (Mexico City Metrobús), a BRT station in Mexico City
 Claves, a fictional character in the video game Eternal Sonata

See also
 Clavé (disambiguation)